Barry Greenwald (born 1954) is a Canadian documentary filmmaker, and co-founder of the Canadian Independent Film Caucus. While in his final year as a student at Conestoga College, he directed the 1975 film Metamorphosis, inspired by Czech documentary filmmaker Vaclav Taborsky, which won the Short Film Palme d'Or at the Cannes Film Festival.  Upon graduation, he worked with the National Film Board of Canada (NFB) as a film editor, before directing documentary films independently.

Greenwald's films include the 1990 one-hour documentary Between Two Worlds, about Inuit Joseph Idlout. Produced by the NFB and Investigative Productions Inc., the film is included in the 2011 Inuit film collection, Unikkausivut: Sharing Our Stories.

References

External links

 
Watch films by Barry Greenwald, National Film Board of Canada
Biography, National Film Board of Canada

1954 births
Canadian documentary film directors
Canadian documentary film producers
National Film Board of Canada people
Film directors from Toronto
Living people
Conestoga College alumni